DBY can refer to:

 Darby Bible
 Derbyshire in England — DBY is the Chapman code for that county
 Derby railway station, whose station code is "DBY"
 Devil Beside You, a Taiwanese drama starring Rainie Yang and Mike He
 DBY, an alias for the enzyme encoded by the DDX3Y gene
 Dalby Airport, IATA airport code "DBY"